The Women's Cup is an annual club women's soccer invitational tournament hosted by Racing Louisville FC in the United States.

History
Launched by OnSide Entertainment, FXE Futbol, and Agrinzonis Management Group in 2021, it currently features six North American, European, and Asian women's soccer teams competing for the championship.

, the absence of a FIFA-organized club world championship similar to the men's FIFA Club World Cup, opens the door for invitational tournaments like The Women's Cup and the Women's International Champions Cup to provide opportunities for prominent women's club teams from different confederations to compete against one another and can be seen as stepping stones for the formation of a Women's Club World Cup.

List of finals

Results by club

Broadcasting
In 2022, matches of the Women's Cup were broadcast via Paramount+.

See also
 Women's International Champions Cup
 UEFA Women's Champions League
 AFC Women's Club Championship
 CAF Women's Champions League
 CONCACAF Women's Champions League
 CONMEBOL Copa Libertadores Femenina

References

External links

The Women's Cup
2021 establishments in the United States
Recurring sporting events established in 2021
Racing Louisville FC